Swallow is a 2021 Nigerian film directed by Kunle Afolayan, written by Sefi Atta and starring Niyola Eniola Akinbo, Deyemi Okanlawon, Chioma Chukwuka Akpotha and Ijeoma Grace Agu. It was released on October 1, 2021, by Netflix.

Plot

Swallow is an adaptation of the book by the same name written by Nigerian author Seffi Atta. It follows the life of Tolani Ajao played by Niyola and her friend Rose played by Ijeoma Grace Agu. They are friends and roommates who work in the same bank. Rose’s Boss Mr. Lamidi Salako is a very promiscuous man who abuses his power to harass his secretary. No one can stand up to him as he has the personnel department in his grip. He fires Rose because she refuses to be continuously harassed by him, and specifically asks for Tolani as replacement.

As predicted by Rose, he harasses Tolani too, who files a complaint in response to his memo accusing her of insubordination. Her complaint is refused by Ignatius in Personnel for his fear of ruining Mr. Salako's image as a married man. Mr. Salako later suspends Tolani when she asks for a vacation, of which she is rightfully due.

Rose meets ‘OC’ played by Kelvin Ikeduba an American returnee who introduces her to the world of drug trafficking. She tries to get a defeated Tolani to join her, and almost does when her boyfriend Sanwo played by Deyemi Okanlawon is swindled of all her savings she borrowed him to start a business.

In the end, Rose travels alone to London after swallowing the drugs, but they burst in her stomach mid flight, killing her. Tolani moves back to the village, where Sanwo comes looking for her and tells her that her boss Mr. Salako was suspended by Personnel. He also tells her about his new job at a consulting firm and returns her money.

Cast 
 Niyola as Tolani Ajao
 Deyemi Okanlawon
 Chioma Chukwuka Akpotha
 Ijeoma Grace Agu
 Mercy Aigbe	
 Omotunde Adebowale David
 Kelvin Ikeduba 
 Frank Donga
 Eniola Badmus

Production
The Screenplay for the novel's adaptation was co-written by Sefi-Atta, the author herself, a playwright, and Kunle Afolayan. Principal Photography took place in Ibadan, Oyo State.

Reception 
Afolayan received knocks for his use of singers in the lead role of his movies. A reviewer for Pulse Nigeria said "Afolayan has a good eye for art direction and is an all round impeccable producer. In 'Swallow', he brandishes his expertise with the portrayal of the fashion, language and events (sometimes monotonous) of the era that the film is set. The screenplay, on the other hand, barely does justice to the literary piece. Though supervised by Atta, 'Swallow' the film feels choppy, missing out on the juices that make the novel stand out." Grace Agu received praise from the reviewer for her role as Rose. A reviewer for Premium Times praised the set designers for their attention to detail and also praised the use of indigenous languages in the film. Grace Agu was also praised for her acting while Niyola was said to have struggled with the role. Conncluding, the reviewer wrote "It is a good movie worth watching especially as a family. It is didactic and entertaining." rating the movie 6/10.

See also
 List of Nigerian films of 2021

References

External links
 
 

2021 films
English-language Netflix original films
Nigerian drama films